Live: The Road is the third live album recorded by the British rock band, the Kinks. It was recorded at Merriweather Post Pavilion, Columbia, Maryland, on 29 June 1987, and at Mann Music Center, Philadelphia, Pennsylvania, on 1 July; the second date provided most of the material on the album. One new song, "The Road", was recorded in the Kinks' own studio in September. Most of the concert songs were previously released on other Kinks albums except for "The Road" and "It (I Want It)".

Upon release, the album, like many other albums the band made at the time, was a flop, both commercially and critically. It reached number 110 on the US Billboard 200. AllMusic's Stephen Thomas Erlewine described the album as "a tepid document of their workmanlike arena rock shows from 1987" and said the album "wasn't anything special."  Rolling Stone was more kind to the album, saying that "it's less predictable and more textured than the tiresome arena-rock performances of the early-Eighties Kinks."

Track listing

Personnel
The Kinks
Ray Davies - lead vocals, guitar
Dave Davies - guitar, backing vocals, lead vocals on "Living On a Thin Line"
Jim Rodford - bass, backing vocals
Bob Henrit - drums
Ian Gibbons - keyboards, backing vocals

Production
Ray Davies - producer
Johnie Rosen – live recording engineer
Dave Powell – overdub engineer
George Holt – overdub assistant engineer
Jeremy Allom – mix engineer
Peter Iverson – mix assistant engineer
Bob Ludwig – mastering engineer

References

The Kinks live albums
1988 live albums
Albums produced by Ray Davies
London Records live albums